Googly is a 2019 Indian romantic comedy film which is directed by Abhimanyu Mukherjee. It is starring Srabanti Chatterjee and Soham Chakraborty.

Cast
Srabonti Chatterjee
Soham Chakraborty
Kanchan Mallick
Aritra Dutta Banik 
Manasi Sinha
Oindrila Saha

Soundtrack

References

External links
 

2019 films
Indian romantic comedy films
2019 romantic comedy films
Bengali-language Indian films
2010s Bengali-language films